Dan Remmes is an American writer and actor.  He is best known as the book writer of Grumpy Old Men: The Musical based on the 1993 movie Grumpy Old Men.

Writer 

As a playwright, Remmes received several awards and was a recipient of the 2002 New York Foundation for the Arts Fellowship for Play Writing and Screenwriting.

Remmes collaborated with composer Neil Berg and lyricist and long-time editor of MAD Magazine, the late Nick Meglin on a stage musical adaptation of the 1993 film Grumpy Old Men starring Jack Lemmon and Walter Matthau. In 2011 it received an out-of-town tryout at the Royal Manitoba Theatre Centre in Winnipeg starring John Rubinstein, John Schuck and Susan Anton. A retooled version made its United States Premiere at the Ogunquit Playhouse in 2018 starring Mark Jacoby, Ed Dixon, Leslie Stevens and featuring Hal Linden and Sally Struthers. The show is licensed by Theatrical Rights Worldwide (TRW).

One of Remmes' plays, Three Tables, was a winner of the Off-Off Broadway festival of plays and is frequently produced in North America and the United Kingdom.  What Doesn't Kill Us received its Hollywood premiere starring Emmy-winner Michelle Stafford directed by Paul Provenza and featuring Remmes in the role of Karl.  Other produced plays include Night Out, Things We Leave Behind, Bedlam, Delays, Leaving London.

Remmes co-created and co-wrote a musical web series parodying self-help gurus entitled Mother Eve's Secret Garden of Sensual Sisterhood in which he also played the character of "Temp."  The series has since been developed into an award-winning stage musical.

Remmes is a frequent collaborator with actor and producer Nellie Bellflower with whom he has three screenplays in development.

Actor 

Remmes received a degree in acting from the American Academy of Dramatic Arts in Los Angeles and has appeared in theater in New York City and Los Angeles as well as on television shows such as Conviction, Law & Order: Criminal Intent, Blind Justice, and Law & Order: Special Victims Unit.

Other 

Remmes frequently writes and performs with Mind The Gap Theatre, an Anglo-American theatre company based in New York City.  He also serves on their Board of Directors.

Remmes wrote a pop ballad entitled "Least Being Me" inspired by the superhero Batman.

References

External links 
 Dan Remmes on Broadway World
 
 Samuel French Play Publishers: Three Tables by Dan Remmes
 Official site

American comedy writers
American male television actors
American musical theatre librettists
American male stage actors
Living people
Year of birth missing (living people)